Dad-windad (also spelled Dad-bendad) was a Parthian grandee, who served as the chief secretary (dabirbad) of the last Arsacid monarch, Artabanus IV. He took part in the climactic battle of Hormozdgan in 224 between the Arsacid and Sasanian forces, which resulted in the defeat and death of Artabanus IV, with Dad-windad meeting his end shortly afterwards.

Biography 
Dad-windad served as the chief secretary, which was a powerful post but also a risky one, with the possibility of a harsh penalty or even death. On April 28 224, Dad-Windad took part in the climactic battle of Hormozdgan between the Arsacid and Sasanian forces. The forces of the Sasanian king Ardashir I numbered 10,000 cavalry, with some of them wearing flexible chain armor akin to that of the Romans. Artabanus V led a greater number of soldiers, who, however, were less disposed, due to wearing the inconvenient lamellar armor. Ardashir's son and heir, Shapur I, as portrayed in the Sasanian rock reliefs, also took part in the battle. Artabanus V was defeated and killed during the battle, which marked the end of the Parthian era and the start of 427-years of Sasanian rule. Dad-windad was afterwards executed by Ardashir I. Ardashir I celebrated his victory in a relief sculptured at his previous capital, Ardashir-Khwarrah (present-day Firuzabad) in his homeland, Pars. On the relief, Ardashir I is portrayed as riding on a horse whilst ousting Artabanus V, who is also mounted. Ardashir I's son Shapur I, also on horseback, is portrayed as impaling Dad-windad with his lance.

References

Sources 
 
 
 
 

3rd-century Iranian people
224 deaths
Year of birth unknown
People from the Parthian Empire